A Dutch oven is a kind of cooking pot.

Dutch oven may also refer to:
 Dutch Oven (horse), a thoroughbred racehorse and winner of 1882 St. Leger Stakes
 Dutch Oven, a pillar in Montana
 Dutch oven, the protective cover for electrical contacts on a railway coupler; particularly, but not exclusively, used on the London Underground 
 Dutch oven (practical joke), flatulating on someone and pulling a blanket or cover over their head, based on a slang phrase describing the mechanics of the cooking pot of the same name
 The Dutch Oven, Union College's satirical newspaper
 Dutch Oven, a nickname for Derek Holland, pitcher for Major League Baseball's San Francisco Giants